Golchehran (also Romanized as Golchehrān; also known as Kucharān and Kulcharān) is a village in Gudarzi Rural District, Oshtorinan District, Borujerd County, Lorestan Province, Iran. At the 2017 census, its population was 1200, in 200 families.

References 

Towns and villages in Borujerd County